The 2020 European University Games would have been the 5th biannual European Universities Games (EUG). It was scheduled to be held in Belgrade, Serbia from 12 July to 26 July. However, this event was postponed to 2021 due to the COVID-19 pandemic on 27 March 2020. The new dates proposed for the competition were from 14 July to 27 July 2021. On 5 May 2021 EUSA announced the games not being held. The event was planned involve 21 different sporting disciplines in the sports programme. It would have been organised by the European University Sports Association (EUSA) and University Sports Federation of Serbia with the special cooperation alongside University of Belgrade.

Sport events

  Badminton 
  Basketball 
  Basketball 3x3 
  Beach handball 
  Beach soccer 
  Beach volleyball 
  Chess 
  Football 
  Futsal 
  Handball 
  Judo 
  Para judo 
  Karate 
  Kickboxing
  Orienteering 
  Rowing 
  Table tennis 
  Para table tennis 
  Taekwondo 
  Tennis 
  Volleyball 
  Water polo

References

External links
Homepage
European Universities Games 2020 at eusa.eu

European Universities Games
European Universities Games
European Universities Games
European Universities Games
Sport in Belgrade
European Universities Games 2020